Jiang Hongkun (born January 1954) is a Chinese politician best known for his term as the mayor of Nanjing, the Communist Party Secretary of Suzhou, and a member of the Jiangsu provincial Party Standing Committee.

Biography

Jiang Hongkun was born in Shazhou County, Jiangsu province, in 1956. He worked as a manual labourer at a rural commune, where he later took on leadership and administrative roles. He joined the Communist Party of China in 1976, at the end of the Cultural Revolution. After the Cultural Revolution, he joined the diesel engine factory in Shazhou County, where he served as a shop floor worker, before being promoted to leadership and administrative roles. In January 1985, he became a manager at the Shazhou Engines Company.

In June 1986, he became head of the international trade commission of the city of Zhangjiagang. In February 1991 he was named vice mayor of Zhangjiagang, and in 1997 elevated to deputy party chief. In December 1997 he was named party chief of Zhangjiagang. In 2001 he was a member of the Suzhou Party Standing Committee, then in November 2001 became vice mayor of Nanjing (department-level), in April 2003 he was named acting mayor of Nanjing, confirmed by a full session of the municipal People's Congress in January 2004.

In August 2009, Jiang was promoted to a member of the Jiangsu provincial Party Standing Committee, then party chief of Suzhou. He left the post in June 2014, after having reached retirement age for active sub-provincial-level officials, and was named a Vice Chairman of the People's Congress of Jiangsu.

References

1954 births
Living people
People's Republic of China politicians from Jiangsu
Chinese Communist Party politicians from Jiangsu
Political office-holders in Jiangsu
People from Zhangjiagang